Depot Nunatak is a nunatak,  high, standing at the west side of Cassidy Glacier and the Quartermain Mountains in Victoria Land. It was so named by the British National Antarctic Expedition, 1901–04, on their western journey in 1903, because they made a food depot there, for use on their return.

References

Nunataks of Victoria Land
Scott Coast